Thailand Film Office is an agency that support and facilitate foreign film production teams of all types, who choose to travel to filming in Thailand as well as being an information center for foreign film production crew. Our main duty is follows:

1. Developing plans and Incentives measures to support related film services business in order to generate national income as well as to promote tourism, culture and arts in Thailand.

2. Considering the granting of shooting permits and monitoring film shoots to ensure that they do not adversely affect Thailand’s image or damage its natural environment.

3. Coordinating with the government agencies concerned in order to facilitate the work foreign film crews.

4. Acting as Assistant Secretary of national film committee.

5. Being a member of Association of film Commissioners International (AFCI) on national behalf.

6. Participating in international film festivals to promote Thailand as a filming location and persuading film makers filming in Thailand as well as using locally available film production services, such as equipment hire, labs and local film crews.

History of Films shot in Thailand

Dozens of foreign films have been shot in Thailand, with the kingdom either playing itself or standing in for a neighboring country, such as Vietnam or Cambodia. The availability of elephants, exotic jungle and beach settings, relatively low production costs, and a mature domestic film industry that provides a legion of experienced crew members, have made Thailand an attractive location for many Hollywood films and other foreign productions. Films set in Thailand include

Around the World in Eighty Days, The Big Boss, The Man with the Golden Gun and The Beach. And Thailand has been used as a stand-in setting for such Vietnam War-era films as The Deer Hunter, Good Morning Vietnam, Casualties of War and The Killing Fields. In addition to providing work for Thai film crews and extras (including the Royal Thai Army), films that use Thailand as a location help Thailand promote itself as a tourist destination. As a result, the

Tourism Authority of Thailand is keenly interested in attracting production companies to make films in the Kingdom. However, over the months, the locations of some films have been criticized as being harmful to the environment. The island used to depict villain's hideout in The Man with the Golden Gun is now a major draw for tourism operators in Phuket's Phang Nga Bay. Environmentalists also protested the filming of The Beach, in which the film crew made alterations to the location that were viewed as damaging. Hollywood has played an important role in the development of Thailand's film industry. One of the first feature films made in Thailand, 1923's Miss Suwanna of Siam, was a Hollywood co-production, made with the royal assistance of King Vajiravudh, who gave the production free use of his 52 automobiles, 600 horses, use of the Royal Thai Navy, the Grand Palace, the railways, the rice mills, rice fields, coconut groves, canals and elephants. The 1927 documentary, Chang, by Merian C. Cooper and Ernest B. Schoedsack, was made in Thailand. In recent years, even the Bollywood film industry has chosen Thailand as location.

Services

The Thailand Film Office website provides an array of information and services covering Thailand in brief, necessary information for visas and work permits, related Government agencies and filming associations in the Kingdom, filming in Thailand media, and lists of studios and equipment in Thailand. According to the Film Act B.E. 2551(2008), any foreigners wishing to film in Thailand are required to hire a local production coordinator, that can be either an individual or a firm, recognised by the Thailand Film Office.

The Thailand Film Office is looking to find future generations of filmmakers and is the official organiser of the Thailand Short Film Competition, which has been running since 2002.

According to Sirinart Theenanondh, chief of film business promotion at the Thailand Film Office, more big budget films are choosing Thailand as a filming location due to Thailand's incentives offered to international films shot locally, with 74 feature films making up a total of 714 productions that used Thailand for shooting in 2018.

Related associations in Thailand

 Film Production Services Association
 Thai Entertainment Industry Association(TENA)
 The Advertising Association of Thailand
 The Federation of National Film Association of Thailand
 Thai Motion Picture Industry Association
 Thai Film Directors Association
 Thai Film Foundation
 Thai Documentary Filmmakers Trade Association (TDFA)

References

External links
 

Sub-departmental government bodies of Thailand
Film organizations in Thailand
Ministry of Tourism and Sports (Thailand)